Northbrook Historic District, also known as Marshall's Mill and Marshall's Station, is a national historic district located in Newlin Township, Pocopson Township, and West Bradford Township, Chester County, Pennsylvania. It encompasses 14 contributing buildings and 3 contributing sites in the village of Northbrook. They are mostly located on five properties and built in the 18th and 19th century. They include the Blacksmith's house, station house, post office and store, coal and lumber company, Lewis Marshall house, Gothic Revival style Indian Rock Farm, Baily House (1902), Northbrook Sunday School (1900), and the site of Hannah Freeman's cabin, Indian Rock, and Indian Burial Ground.

It was added to the National Register of Historic Places in 1985.

References

Gothic Revival architecture in Pennsylvania
Historic districts on the National Register of Historic Places in Pennsylvania
Historic districts in Chester County, Pennsylvania
National Register of Historic Places in Chester County, Pennsylvania